In Boolean functions and propositional calculus, the Sheffer stroke denotes a logical operation that is equivalent to the negation of the conjunction operation, expressed in ordinary language as "not both".  It is also called nand  ("not and") or the alternative denial, since it says in effect that at least one of its operands is false.  In digital electronics, it corresponds to the NAND gate. It is named after Henry M. Sheffer and written as ↑ or as | (but not as ||, often used to represent disjunction). In Bocheński notation it can be written as Dpq.

Its dual is the NOR operator (also known as the Peirce arrow or Quine dagger). Like its dual, NAND can be used by itself, without any other logical operator, to constitute a logical formal system (making NAND functionally complete). This property makes the NAND gate crucial to modern digital electronics, including its use in computer processor design.

Definition
The NAND operation is a logical operation on two logical values.  It produces a value of true, if — and only if — at least one of the propositions is false.

Truth table

Logical equivalences

History
The stroke is named after Henry M. Sheffer, who in 1913 published a paper in the Transactions of the American Mathematical Society  providing an axiomatization of Boolean algebras using the stroke, and proved its equivalence to a standard formulation thereof by Huntington employing the familiar operators of propositional logic (and, or, not). Because of self-duality of Boolean algebras, Sheffer's axioms are equally valid for either of the NAND or NOR operations in place of the stroke. Sheffer interpreted the stroke as a sign for nondisjunction (NOR) in his paper, mentioning non-conjunction only in a footnote and without a special sign for it.  It was Jean Nicod who first used the stroke as a sign for non-conjunction (NAND) in a paper of 1917 and which has since become current practice. Russell and Whitehead used the Sheffer stroke in the 1927 second edition of Principia Mathematica and suggested it as a replacement for the "or" and "not" operations of the first edition.

Charles Sanders Peirce (1880) had discovered the functional completeness of NAND or NOR more than 30 years earlier, using the term ampheck (for 'cutting both ways'), but he never published his finding. Two years before Sheffer, Edward Stamm also described the NAND and NOR operators and showed that the other Boolean operations could be expressed by it.

Properties
NAND does not possess any of the following five properties, each of which is required to be absent from, and the absence of all of which is sufficient for, at least one member of a set of functionally complete operators: truth-preservation, falsity-preservation, linearity, monotonicity, self-duality. (An operator is truth- (falsity-) preserving if its value is truth (falsity) whenever all of its arguments are truth (falsity).) Therefore {NAND} is a functionally complete set.

This can also be realized as follows: All three elements of the functionally complete set {AND, OR, NOT} can be constructed using only NAND. Thus the set {NAND} must be functionally complete as well.

Other Boolean operations in terms of the Sheffer stroke

Expressed in terms of NAND , the usual operators of propositional logic are:

Formal system based on the Sheffer stroke
The following is an example of a formal system based entirely on the Sheffer stroke, yet having the functional expressiveness of the propositional logic:

Symbols
pn for natural numbers n:
( | )

The Sheffer stroke commutes but does not associate (e.g., (T | T) | F = T, but T | (T | F) = F). Hence any formal system including the Sheffer stroke as an infix symbol must also include a means of indicating grouping (grouping is automatic if the stroke is used as a prefix, thus: || TTF = T and | T | TF = F). We shall employ '(' and ')' to this effect.

We also write p, q, r, … instead of p0, p1, p2.

Syntax
Construction Rule I: For each natural number n, the symbol pn is a well-formed formula (wff), called an atom.

Construction Rule II: If X and Y are wffs, then (X | Y) is a wff.

Closure Rule: Any formulae which cannot be constructed by means of the first two Construction Rules are not wffs.

The letters U, V, W, X, and Y are metavariables standing for wffs.

A decision procedure for determining whether a formula is well-formed goes as follows: "deconstruct" the formula by applying the Construction Rules backwards, thereby breaking the formula into smaller subformulae. Then repeat this recursive deconstruction process to each of the subformulae. Eventually the formula should be reduced to its atoms, but if some subformula cannot be so reduced, then the formula is not a wff.

Calculus
All wffs of the form
((U | (V | W)) | ((Y | (Y | Y)) | ((X | V) | ((U | X) | (U | X)))))
are axioms. Instances of

are inference rules.

Simplification
Since the only connective of this logic is |, the symbol | could be discarded altogether, leaving only the parentheses to group the letters. A pair of parentheses must always enclose a pair of wffs. Examples of theorems in this simplified notation are

 (p(p(q(q((pq)(pq)))))),

 (p(p((qq)(pp)))).

The notation can be simplified further, by letting
 
 
for any U.  This simplification causes the need to change some rules:
 More than two letters are allowed within parentheses.
 Letters or wffs within parentheses are allowed to commute.
 Repeated letters or wffs within a same set of parentheses can be eliminated.
The result is a parenthetical version of the Peirce existential graphs.

Another way to simplify the notation is to eliminate parentheses by using Polish Notation. For example, the earlier examples with only parentheses could be rewritten using only strokes as follows

 (p(p(q(q((pq)(pq)))))) becomes
 | p | p | q | q || pq | pq, and

 (p(p((qq)(pp)))) becomes,
 | p | p || qq | pp.

This follows the same rules as the parenthesis version, with the opening parenthesis replaced with a Sheffer stroke and the (redundant) closing parenthesis removed.

Or (for some formulas) one could omit both parentheses and strokes and allow the order of the arguments to determine the order of function application so that for example, applying the function from right to left (reverse Polish notation – any other unambiguous convention based on ordering would do)

See also

 Boolean domain
 CMOS
 Gate equivalent (GE)
 Laws of Form
 Logical graph
 Minimal axioms for Boolean algebra
 NAND flash memory
 NAND logic
 Peirce's law
 Peirce arrow = NOR
 Sole sufficient operator

Notes

References
Bocheński, Józef Maria (1960), Precis of Mathematical Logic, rev., Albert Menne, edited and translated from the French and German editions by Otto Bird, Dordrecht, South Holland:  D. Reidel.

 Charles Sanders Peirce, 1880, "A Boolian[sic] Algebra with One Constant", in Hartshorne, C. and Weiss, P., eds., (1931–35) Collected Papers of Charles Sanders Peirce, Vol. 4: 12–20, Cambridge:  Harvard University Press.

External links

Sheffer Stroke article in the Internet Encyclopedia of Philosophy
http://hyperphysics.phy-astr.gsu.edu/hbase/electronic/nand.html
implementations of 2 and 4-input NAND gates
Proofs of some axioms by Stroke function by Yasuo Setô @ Project Euclid

NAND gate
Logical connectives
Logic symbols